Michel Roger (born 9 March 1949) was the Minister of State of Monaco.

He had been a member of the High Court of Monaco since 2007. He assumed office on 29 March 2010, following his appointment by Prince Albert II. Prior to his taking up of the role he was also an inspector general of the French National Education.

Honours 
 2016: Grand officer in the Order of Saint-Charles.
 2016:  Order of Friendship, following the year of Russia in Monaco.

References

1949 births
French judges on the courts of Monaco
Living people
Ministers of State of Monaco
Officers of the Ordre national du Mérite
University of Poitiers alumni
Academic staff of the University of Poitiers